Richard Shulmistra (born April 1, 1971) is a Canadian former professional ice hockey goaltender. He played two games in the National Hockey League with the New Jersey Devils and Florida Panthers between 1998 and 2000, while the rest of his career, which lasted from 1994 to 2004, was spent mainly in the minor leagues. Prior to turning professional Shulmistra played US college hockey at Miami University.

Collegiate career 

Shulmistra played junior hockey for the Thunder Bay Flyers of the United States Hockey League for their 1989-90 season before signing to play for the Miami RedHawks of the Central Collegiate Hockey Association.  He was drafted by the Quebec Nordiques in the 1992 NHL Supplemental Draft.  Miami capped a historic year for the program in 1993 when the team received its first bid to the NCAA Men's Ice Hockey Tournament.  Miami was led by Brian Savage (2nd-Team All-American, 37 goals), defenseman Bobby Marshall (2nd-Team All American, 45 points) and Shulmistra with a 2.71 GAA.  The team lost in the first round to Wisconsin 3–1 at the Joe Louis Arena in Detroit, Michigan.  Shulmistra turned pro after the 1993-94 Miami campaign in which he was named the Miami team MVP.

Professional career 

Shulmistra spent most of his professional career in the US minor leagues, starting with the Cornwall Aces, the American Hockey League affiliate of Quebec.  He played one game for the New Jersey Devils on January 1, 1998, saving 28 shots in a 2-1 loss to the Florida Panthers.  He next saw the NHL on December 27, 1999, saving 20 shots for Florida in a 6-1 victory over the Tampa Bay Lightning.  Shulmistra then went to Germany in 2001, playing for the Berlin Polar Bears and the Mannheim Eagles in the Deutsche Eishockey Liga in his three seasons abroad.  He retired after the 2003-04 season.

Personal life 

Shulmistra now lives in North Carolina and works as a goalie coach. He coached the bantam AAA Carolina Jr Hurricanes team for one season. He produced the video series "Winning Hockey Goaltending featuring Coach Richard Shulmistra."

Career statistics

Regular season and playoffs

Awards and honours

References

External links
 

1971 births
Living people
Adler Mannheim players
Albany River Rats players
Canadian ice hockey goaltenders
Chicago Wolves players
Cornwall Aces players
Eisbären Berlin players
Florida Everblades players
Florida Panthers players
Fort Wayne Komets players
Ice hockey people from Ontario
Kansas City Blades players
Louisville Panthers players
Manitoba Moose (IHL) players
Miami RedHawks men's ice hockey players
National Hockey League supplemental draft picks
New Jersey Devils players
Orlando Solar Bears (IHL) players
Quebec Nordiques draft picks
Sportspeople from Greater Sudbury
Thunder Bay Flyers players